Shqiponjat is a popular Italo-Albanian folk music group based in Santa Sofia d'Epiro, Calabria, Italy.

History

The folk group was born on initiative of 12 girls in a small town of Albanian origin (Arbëreshë) called Santa Sofia D’Epiro in the spring of 1994 and becomes a cultural association 10 years later.

In accordance with the emblem (two-headed eagle) of the homeland of their ancestors (Albania) they chose the name Shqiponjat which means eagles. (See also: Arbëreshë people#Early migrations)

Over the years, the number of members has grown and today includes 30 female dancers, aged 12 to 30 years, and an orchestra of 7 male musicians. The group's goal is to keep alive the ancient arbëreshë values and the traditions, included songs and costumes.

Peculiarities of the 'Eagles' (Shqiponjat) is to perform with a formation composed by only women. From ancient manuscripts and the oral tradition, it appears that, at the time of the Ottoman invasion in Albania,  women – in addition to  the family hearth -  were dancing and singing to honor their husbands return from battle.

Music repertoire
The show offered by Shqiponjat represents metaphorically the long journey that their ancestors have undertaken from the faraway Albanian coast to reach the Calabria territory in Italy at the end of the 15th century.

In addition to the typical dances of the Albanian capital Tirana, there are those of Kosovo, in honor of the Albanian national hero, Skanderbeg and those of the northern and southern Albanian regions. Regarding the arbëreshe tradition, we find those linked to the traditional “Vallja”, to the cycle of seasons or to the theme of love and nostalgia. The arbëresh repertory includes the ancient traditional rhymed and often improvised songs, called “vjershë” (poem), performed without musical accompaniment, sung only by double or triple voices.

Exhibitions
The work developed by Shqiponjat is orientated to recover the origins of history as well as the Albanian culture, but more than anything else it wants to be a sort of “spiritual heredity”, or simply, a good reason to re-live a past still inside them, giving strength, at the same time, to the sense of belonging to the same community with their roots in the past and their wings towards the future.

The originality, serious work of research and the skill of the artists allowed to obtain prizes and awards not only in Italy, but also abroad, where often the group was called to represent the Italian-Albanian minority. For more than 20 years of activity the group has constantly taken part in a lot of local, regional and national folkloric events.
In 2003 the group participated at Eurofestival Mediterraneo (Mediterranean Euro Festivals) in San Cosmo Albanese and was named the best Arbëreshgroup with its theatrical representation of “Java Nusses” (the week of the bride).
 In 2004, for the 10th anniversary from the foundation, the group decided to organize in Santa Sofia d'Epiro a two day show of the recovery of their traditions called “Moti ç’ ish në herë” (as it once was).
In 2005, the group participated in Santa Sofia d'Epiro at the traditional arbëreshë olympic games “Lumi bashkë” (“Let’s play together”).
In 2006, the ‘Eagles’ (Shqiponjat) fly to Albania to take part in the international folkloric festival “Vlore 2006” in Vlorë 
in 2007, they participated at the Festival Mesdhetar in Valona and
in 2008, two young Arbreshë lovers, Thanasi and Anmaria, are the protagonists of the theatrical representation Një Spingullanele Ari held between the characteristic districts (gjitonia) of Santa Sophia d'Epiro
in September 2008, the ‘Eagles’ took part at the festival of Gjirokastër “Argjiro 2008” in Argirocastro in South Albania
In 2011, they fly to Wilstedt, in Germany, called there to represent the Italian Arbëria.

Photo gallery

External links

Official Website
Shqipet played by Shqiponjat musicians
The Shqiponjat children, Bukuria Arbëreshë (Arbëreshë Beauties) in Cosenza, May 21, 2017

References 

Italian folk music groups
Arbëreshë folk groups